Maindhan is a 1994 Indian Tamil language action drama film directed by Pugazhendhi. The film stars Selva and Nirosha, with Napoleon, Kalyan Kumar, Pandiyan, Srikanth, Chandrasekhar, Nizhalgal Ravi, Prathapachandran, Vadivelu playing supporting roles. It was released on 1 July 1994.

Plot 
Ramasamy Mudaliar (Kalyan Kumar) is a village chief who follows Gandhian principles, while his son Jeeva (Selva) is a jobless youth. Lakshmi (Nirosha) is in love with her cousin Jeeva. Velayudam Pillai (Napoleon), a rich villager, plans to buy the village farmers' grounds and build a liquor factory there. Ramasamy Mudaliar tries to stop him and is subsequently killed. Jeeva becomes a responsible citizen and decides to take revenge on Velayudam Pillai.

Cast 

Selva as Jeeva
Nirosha as Lakshmi
Napoleon as Velayudam Pillai
Kalyan Kumar as Ramasamy Mudaliar, Jeeva's father
Pandiyan as Inspector Vijay
Srikanth as Ranjan
Chandrasekhar as Thyagu
Nizhalgal Ravi as Ponrasu
Prathapachandran as DSP
Vadivelu
Kumarimuthu
Chinni Jayanth
K. S. G. Venkatesh
Jayanthi
Monica
Swaminathan
Swamikannu as Periyasaamy
Arulmani as S. R. S.
Haja Shareef
M. R. K
Mohankumar
Hariprakash
Aakash
Chitraguptan

Soundtrack 
The music was composed by Deva, with lyrics written by Mu. Metha.

Reception 
Malini Mannath of The Indian Express said the film gave a sense of "déjà vu".

References

External links 
 

1990s Tamil-language films
1994 films
Films scored by Deva (composer)
Indian action drama films